Maxine Marshall (born 10 July 1991), is a British singer from London. She is best known for featuring on Matrix & Futurebound's 2013 single "Control", which peaked at number seven on the UK Singles Chart in January 2014.

Music career

2013–present: Breakthrough
On 12 July 2013 Max Marshall released her debut single "Don't Trip". On 4 October 2013 she released her debut EP Pressure. In late-2013, she featured on Matrix & Futurebound's single "Control". The single entered at number 18 on the UK Singles Chart on 5 January 2014 – for the week ending dated 11 January 2014 – before going on to peak at number seven on the chart the following week, becoming Matrix & Futurebound's biggest hit. The song has also peaked to number 4 on the UK Dance Chart.

Discography

Extended plays

Singles

As lead artist

As featured artist

References

1991 births
Living people
British women pop singers